The Atlas car was built in Pittsburgh, Pennsylvania, in  1906–1907. The Atlas Automobile Company was established on College Avenue in the East End of Pittsburgh, Pennsylvania in late 1906 in a "fireproof garage."  It was a four-cylinder car rated at 25/30 hp with shaft drive and a 3-speed sliding gear transmission. It was offered as a touring car or runabout. The firm was out of business by the next year.

Notes

References
G.N. Georgano, Nick (Ed.). The Beaulieu Encyclopedia of the Automobile. Chicago: Fitzroy Dearborn, 2000. 
Kimes, Beverly Rae and Clark Jr, Henry Austin.  Standard Catalog of American Cars: 1805–1942 (Third Edition). Iola, WI: Krause. 1996. 

Defunct motor vehicle manufacturers of the United States
Motor vehicle manufacturers based in Pennsylvania